Heikki Kyöstilä (born January 1946) is a Finnish billionaire, and the founder, owner and president of dental equipment maker Planmeca.

Kyöstilä founded Planmeca in Helsinki in 1971, and it now employs 2,700 people worldwide.

Kyöstilä lives in Helsinki, Finland.

References

1946 births
Living people
Finnish billionaires
Finnish businesspeople